In enzymology, a cis-1,2-dihydroxy-4-methylcyclohexa-3,5-diene-1-carboxylate dehydrogenase is an enzyme that catalyzes the chemical reaction

cis-1,2-dihydroxy-4-methylcyclohexa-3,5-diene-1-carboxylate + NAD(P)+  4-methylcatechol + NAD(P)H + CO2

The 3 substrates of this enzyme are cis-1,2-dihydroxy-4-methylcyclohexa-3,5-diene-1-carboxylate, NAD+, and NADP+, whereas its 4 products are 4-methylcatechol, NADH, NADPH, and CO2.

This enzyme belongs to the family of oxidoreductases, specifically those acting on the CH-CH group of donor with NAD+ or NADP+ as acceptor.  The systematic name of this enzyme class is cis-1,2-dihydroxy-4-methylcyclohexa-3,5-diene-1-carboxylate:NAD(P)+ oxidoreductase (decarboxylating). This enzyme participates in toluene and xylene degradation.

References

 

EC 1.3.1
NADPH-dependent enzymes
NADH-dependent enzymes
Enzymes of unknown structure